ShanghaiTech University (ShanghaiTech) is a public research university in Shanghai, China. The university is founded by contracts between the Shanghai Municipal People's Government and the Chinese Academy of Sciences. The university has been added into Chinese state Double First Class University Plan since February 2022. 

The university has five schools and three research institutes. In 2018, it had 1433 undergraduates, 1788 Master's and PhD students, and 485 faculty members.

As of 2021, ShanghaiTech University is ranked among the world's top 500 universities according to the Academic Ranking of World Universities and the U.S. News & World Report Best Global University Ranking.

ShanghaiTech also ranked 12nd in the world for Nature Index 2021 Young Universities (Leading 150 Young Universities) and 48th in China for Nature Index 2022.

Timeline 
 February 2022: Shanghai Tech became a Chinese state Double First Class University.
 December 2016: Shanghai Tech finished its move to the new campus.
 Spring 2016: The first batch of master students graduated from ShanghaiTech University.
 September 30, 2014: ShanghaiTech's first 207 undergraduate students started their first day of the 2014 semester. 
 February 2014: ShanghaiTech Founding President Jiang Mianheng and University Council Chairman Zhu Zhiyuan were inaugurated. 
 January 24, 2014: China's Ministry of Education approved ShanghaiTech's 2014 undergraduate enrollment plan.
 September 30, 2013: China's Ministry of Education approved the official establishment of ShanghaiTech University.
 September 3, 2013: ShanghaiTech's first 296 graduate students started their first day.
 December 28, 2012: ShanghaiTech University laid its foundation in Pudong Science and Technology Park.
 April 28, 2012: China's Ministry of Education approved the planning for ShanghaiTech University.
 May 23, 2011: Shanghai Municipal Government and Chinese Academy of Sciences decided to jointly form the ShanghaiTech Development Steering Group and the ShanghaiTech Development Working Group.
 September 26, 2008: The Chinese Academy of Sciences (CAS) and the Shanghai Municipal Government signed a Broad Collaboration Agreement to jointly establish the Shanghai Pudong Science and Technology Park of CAS, the Shanghai Advanced Research Institute (SARI) of CAS, and a research university.
 June 23, 2004: Shanghai Municipal Government and Chinese Academy of Sciences (CAS) initiated the planning of a research university in Pudong New Area.

The school was founded by the Shanghai municipal government and Chinese Academy of Sciences. In 2014 Jiang Mianheng, the son of former CCP General Secretary Jiang Zemin, became president of the ShanghaiTech University. Before his death in December 2018, Zhang Shoucheng was a professor at ShanghaiTech University.

Schools and institutes 

The university has five schools in operation:
 School of Physical Science and Technology Dean: Peidong Yang
 School of Information Science and Technology Dean: Cher Wang
 School of Life Science and Technology Dean: Haifan Lin
 School of Entrepreneurship and Management Dean: Hanming Fang
 School of Art and Creativity
ShanghaiTech has two research institutes:
 Shanghai Institute for Advanced Immunochemical Studies Director: Richard A. Lerner
iHuman Institute  Director: Raymond C. Stevens

School of Physical Science and Technology 
The School of Physical Science and Technology offers bachelor, master and PhD degrees in physics, astronomy, chemistry, material science and technology and energyenvironmentalnment science.

The research of the school is concentrating on:
 Material discovery, design and synthesis (materials chemistry, biomaterials, synthesis and process, catalysis, nanometer, polymer, surface science, solid state chemistry, soft and hard material interface, environmental sensing and recovery materials).
 Condensed matter and material physics (experimental and theoretical condensed matter physics, physical behavior of materials, electronic materials, energy storage materials, low-dimensional materials, quantum materials, metamaterials, materials theory)
 Spectroscopy and Instrumentation Science (Ultrafast Spectroscopy, Scattering and Microscopy, Electron Beam and Scanning Probe Technology and Instruments, Ultrafast Materials Science, In Situ Electron Microscopy, In Situ Ultrafast Spectroscopy, Sensing and Detection)
 Material Engineering

School of Information Science and Technology 
The School of Information Science and Technology offers two bachelor's degrees: Computer Science and 'Electrical and Information Engineering' and Master and PhD degrees in four directions: Computing Theory and Software, Computer Systems and Applications, Information Theory and Systems, Electronic Devices and Integrated Systems.

The research of the school is concentrated in seven research centers:
 Post-Moore Microelectronics and Integrated Circuit Center: Research on the next-generation Integrated Circuit technologies by investigating lower-power and higher-performance innovations from the fundamental device physics to the computer architecture level.
 Data Science and Machine Intelligence Center: Research on basic mathematics and statistical theory of high dimensional data analysis, efficient and extensible machine learning algorithms, intelligent data acquisition devices and equipment, parallel distributed computer systems and software development platforms, and applications of image, video, text, speech, bioinformatics and other aspects.
 Virtual Reality and Visual Computing Center: Aims to realize indistinguishable virtual reality contents from the perspectives of fundamental research core techniques in light field acquisition, storage, processing, rendering and display. Research on capturing, processing and tele-presence of 360-degree 3D dynamic real scenes up to the human-eye resolution.
 Center for Advanced Power and Energy Systems (CAPES): CAPES at ShanghaiTech aims to integrate the cutting-edge technologies including distributed microgrid, smart grid, plug-in electric vehicle, internet of things, and big data; and to comprehensively optimize the whole process of power generation, energy storage, power distribution and utilization. 
 ShanghaiTech Automation and Robotics Center (STAR Center): The STAR Center is working on Intelligent Algorithms, Software and Systems for Advanced Research and Applications in Automation and Robotics. It combines areas like Computer Science and Artificial Intelligence, Control and Optimization, Computer Vision and Mechanical and Electrical Engineering. 
 Computer System Security Center: The center researches on scalable, reliable, secure systems, with an emphasis on mobile computing and security, Internet of Things security, software security, cryptography and formal verification.
 Network scIence CentEr (NICE) : Work on network communication, network security, cloud storage, network information processing and massive MIMO signal processing.

School of Life Science and Technology 
The School of Life Science and Technology conducts teaching and research in all fundamental areas of life science. Its research is focused on, but not limited to, genomics and proteomics, epigenetics, RNA biology, systems biology, stem cell biology and regenerative medicine, super-resolution microscopy, chemical biology and drug discovery, and translational medicine.

School of Entrepreneurship and Management 
The School of Entrepreneurship and Management does not offer degrees but instead teaches all students of ShanghaiTech University in creativity and creative confidence, critical-thinking and about skills which leads to learning how to innovate. Among others, courses are taught on Economics and Design Thinking.

School of Creative Arts 
The School of Creative Arts offers no degrees but it offers a non-diploma course with the University of South California and is planning to offer students art courses and lectures. The dean of SCA is Li Ruigang, the former president of the Shanghai Media Group and the chairman of China Media Capital. The vice dean is John McIntosh, former chair of Computer Art in SVA, New York.

Shanghai Institute for Advanced Immunochemical Studies 
The Shanghai Institute for Advanced Immunochemical Studies is performing antibody and immunochemistry  research, dedicated to the understanding of the basic structure and design of biological molecules. It has eight key laboratories in the fields of antibody design, ADC chemistry, phenotypic screening, structure biochemistry, cell biology, stem cell biology, antibody engineering and antibody structure, covering all the capabilities that one needs to go from discovery of an important antibody through all the steps necessary to turn it into a drug. Besides, seven large technical platforms including cell sorting, imaging, protein and gene, HTS, informatics, analytical and animal sciences are also being developed. 
Nobel laureate James Rothman is a Professor-in-Residence of SIAIS.

iHuman Institute 

The iHuman Institute focused exclusively on the basic and applied science of human cell signaling, with research groups in the fields of Chemical and Cell Biology, Chemistry, Antibody Development, Computational Chemistry, Imaging, Structural Biology, System Biology, and Translational Biology. Basic science is at the core of the iHuman Institute, with direct application to drug discovery. Raymond C. Stevens is the director of the iHuman Institute and Nobel laureate Kurt Wüthrich is leading the iHuman research group on Molecular Structural Biology.

Campus 

The ShanghaiTech campus is located in the Zhangjiang Hi-Tech Park, amongst many national and international R&D-based companies. The university is in very close proximity to the Shanghai Synchrotron Radiation Facility, the Shanghai Advanced Research Institute and the National Center for Protein Science Shanghai. The campus was designed by Moore Ruble Yudell Architects and won the Merit Award for Urban Design Award 2012 of the American Institute of Architects, California Council. With 0.6 square kilometer and a construction area of 701,500 square meters the campus represents investments of the Shanghai Municipal Government of 4.169 billion CNY.

Academics 
The low student-to-faculty ratio of at most 12 to 1 is hoped to ensure teaching quality. When the school opened, it had plans to enroll 2,000 undergraduate students and 4,000 graduate students immediately. In the future, ShanghaiTech aims to host 1000 faculty, including 500 adjunct professors from institutes of the Chinese Academy of Sciences and other universities. The university will then educate 2000 undergraduate and 4000 graduate students (including 3,000 Ph.D. candidates).

ShanghaiTech hosts four nobel laureates. Roger D. Kornberg and Kurt Wüthrich have both been professors, as has James E. Rothman, 2013 Nobel Prize in Physiology or Medicine.

Undergraduate program 
The four year undergraduate program at ShanghaiTech University has 3 semesters (fall, spring and summer) per school year. The summer semester is mainly for course projects, with music and painting courses available.

Research 
By 2017, the school had 145 research teams.

A research team at the school found "cerium can capture sunlight and cause a light-catalyzed reaction." The team then "developed a catalyst combination of cerium and alcohol, which can convert methane into fuel at room temperature, with no need of heat or condensation."

The school is involved with studying artificial intelligence. In September 2018, researchers at the school published an article saying they had successfully replaced genetic material in a human embryo that caused Marfan syndrome.

A team at the school also "exploited the natural secretion of amyloid fibres from the bacterium bacillus subtilis for 3D printing to produce customized nanoscale biomaterials."

Rankings and reputation

Nature Index 
Nature Index tracks the affiliations of high-quality scientific articles and presents research outputs by institution and country on monthly basis.

Gallery

See also
 The Chinese Academy of Sciences
 University of the Chinese Academy of Sciences
 University of Science and Technology of China
 Shanghai Synchrotron Radiation Facility

References 

 
Universities and colleges in Shanghai
Educational institutions established in 2013
2013 establishments in China
Vice-ministerial universities in China
Technical universities and colleges in China